Hip Hop Hurrà is an Italian television series. It was broadcast on Disney Channel in 2007.

See also
List of Italian television series

External links
 

Italian television series
2007 Italian television series debuts
2007 Italian television series endings
2000s Italian television series